Charles Edward McRae (born September 16, 1968) is Senior VP Operations for Radiology Partners and a former American football offensive tackle in the National Football League. He spent five seasons with the Tampa Bay Buccaneers, starting 38 at right tackle and left guard before finishing his career with the Oakland Raiders.

Early life
McRae was born at Wurtsmith Air Force Base in Oscoda Township, Michigan, on September 16, 1968 and moved to Clinton, Tennessee at the age of seven where he was a two-year starter in football and basketball at Clinton Senior High School.

Accolades
On September 4, 2003, Charles McRae was named one of the "Legends of the Game" with teammate Tony Thompson and was recognized before the Tennessee - Marshall football game at Neyland Stadium.

In 2008, McRae was inducted into the Anderson County, TN Hall of Fame.

On October 28, 2011, Charles McRae was inducted into the Clinton High School "Wall of Fame."

On August 4, 2015, Charles joined the Greater Knoxville Sports Hall of Fame.

College career
McRae played football at the University of Tennessee, first as a defensive lineman under coach Ken Donahue and the last two and a half years as offensive tackle under offensive coordinator and line coach, Phillip Fulmer, earning All-SEC and Academic All-SEC honors. McRae studied physics, computer science and history, graduating with a bachelor's degree in history in May 1991.

Professional career
McRae was drafted in the first round of the 1991 NFL Draft by the Tampa Bay Buccaneers, and was the first offensive player selected. When his Volunteers teammate Antone Davis was selected with the eighth pick, it marked the first time in NFL Draft history that one school produced two top-10 selected offensive tackles in the same year. Charles signed with the Oakland Raiders in March 1996 as an unrestricted free agent where he spent one year as an offensive tackle and guard.

Business/Post Athletic Career
McRae returned to the University of Tennessee's Haslam College of Business in 2000 and earned a Master of Business Administration (MBA) degree in December 2002.

Upon graduation, McRae was chosen to be the first Administrator for Vista Radiology, PC, in March 2003, a position he held until October 2011. November 2011, McRae joined Columbus Radiology as CEO. Columbus Radiology was acquired by Radiology Partners in August, 2016.

June 2013, Charles McRae was elected to the board of directors of the Radiology Business Management Association (RBMA) and appointed to serve as Chair of the RBMA's Radiology Integration Models Task Force.

Personal
Charles is married to Lori Baxter. In addition to working and playing with his seven children, McRae is a licensed pilot, PADI scuba certified, boater, and outdoorsman.

References

External links

Living people
1968 births
People from Tennessee
American football offensive tackles
Tennessee Volunteers football players
Tampa Bay Buccaneers players
Oakland Raiders players
People from Oscoda, Michigan
People from Clinton, Tennessee